Double Crater is an extinct Pleistocene volcano within the San Francisco volcanic field, north of Flagstaff, Arizona.  It is to the southeast of Sunset Crater.

References

Mountains of Arizona
Volcanoes of Arizona
Landforms of Coconino County, Arizona
Extinct volcanoes
Mountains of Coconino County, Arizona
Pleistocene volcanoes